Now What (foaled 1937, in Kentucky) was an American Thoroughbred Champion racehorse. Her dam was That's That, and her sire was the 1927 American Horse of the Year and two-time Leading sire in North America, Chance Play.

Bred by Guy and E. Paul Waggoner's Three D's Stock Farm of Fort Worth, Texas, Now What was raced by Alfred G. Vanderbilt II. Trained by Bud Stotler, she earned National Champion honors at age two after winning four important stakes races and running second in the Pimlico Nursery Stakes, and Juvenile Stakes. As a three-year-old, her best result in a top-level race was a second place finish in the Molly Brant Handicap at Saratoga Race Course. 

Now What served as a broodmare for Vanderbilt. Her most successful foal to race was Next Move, the 1950 American Champion Three-Year-Old Filly and the 1952 American Co-Champion Older Female Horse.

Pedigree

References

1937 racehorse births
Racehorses bred in Kentucky
Racehorses trained in the United States
American Champion racehorses
Vanderbilt family
Thoroughbred family 20
Godolphin Arabian sire line